The list of ship commissionings in 1997 includes a chronological list of all ships commissioned in 1997.


See also 

1997
 Ship commissionings